Regina Lamisi Awiniman Anabilla Akuka (born  1986) also known by the stage name Lamisi is a Ghanaian singer, songwriter and performer from the Upper East Region

Early life
Lamisi attended St. Peter's Methodist JSS for her basic education. She then proceeded to Ashaiman Senior High School for her senior high school education. She moved to University of Professional Studies for her Bachelor of Science degree in Marketing and then proceeded to the University of Ghana for her Master of Philosophy in Dance Education.

Career
Lamisi started her singing career as a lead singer for The Patch Bay Band performing throughout Ghana. Lamisi's musical talent was inspired by listening to Miriam Makeba, Aretha Franklin, Chaka Khan, Angelique Kidjo and many other musicians. Her versatile voice has taken her to a credible level giving her the opportunity to work and collaborate with musicians of international renown (in the Studios and on stages) like Rocky Dawuni, Stonebwoy, Sarkodie, Samini, Amandzeba, Atongo Zimba, Becca, Afro Moses, Patoranking from Nigeria and Lady May from Namibia.

Lamisi released her first single titled "Tanka Fanka" which marked her debut solo career with music she calls "Afro-fusion pop". Alongside "Tanka Fanka" she released two other singles titled "Mr Strawberry" and "Kuul Runnings". Lamisi featured on Ghana's first Reggae/Dancehall Compilation by Irie Ites Studio in 2016.

Discography
Brighter Side (2019)

Singles

Videography

References

External links

Living people
1986 births
Neo soul singers
21st-century Ghanaian women singers
21st-century Ghanaian singers
University of Ghana alumni